μ Cygni, Latinised as Mu Cygni, is a binary star system in the northern constellation of Cygnus. It is visible to the naked eye as a faint point of light with a combined apparent visual magnitude of 4.49. The system is located 72 light years distant from the Sun, based on parallax, and is drifting further away with a radial velocity of +17 km/s.

The primary, with an apparent magnitude of 4.69, is an F-type main-sequence star with a stellar classification of F6V. It has 35% more mass than the Sun and 188% of the Sun's radius. The star is spinning with a projected rotational velocity of 9.6 km/s. The secondary companion, with an apparent magnitude of 6.12, is a G-type main-sequence star with a class of G2V. It has a similar radius as the Sun and slightly more mass.

Two reported additional components, C (apparent magnitude 12.93) and D (apparent magnitude 6.94), are believed to be optical doubles rather than part of the Mu Cygni system.  Component D is the more distant spectroscopic binary HD 206874 (HIP 107326), consisting of two early F-type subgiants.

References

F-type main-sequence stars
G-type main-sequence stars
Binary stars

Cygnus (constellation)
Cygni, Mu
Durchmusterung objects
Cygni, 78
206826/7
107310
8309/10